The Samuel Hieatt House is a Greek Revival house built around 1850 approximately five miles north of Smithfield, Kentucky. It was listed on the National Register of Historic Places in 1982 due to its architectural significance as an outstanding example of Greek Revival style in Henry County.

History
The house was built around 1850 by Samuel Hieatt, a prosperous local farmer. In the American Civil War, which started after the completion of the house, Hieatt took a neutral position and housed both sides at the farm.

Architecture
The house is a rectangular two-story brick building. There is a portico with four Ionic order columns at the entrance.

The interior is unaltered, and is carried out in the Greek Revival style as well. The central hallway features a floating spiral staircase made of walnut. The hallway, front room and dining room have the original faux marbling on the baseboards. Massive nine-foot doors estimated to weigh 600 pounds each separate the front room and dining room. Inset pilasters appear to support a raised pediment in the front room and dining room. The flooring was made with ash and poplar planks.

Other structures from the original farm include a cellar and a carriage house that no longer exists.

References

National Register of Historic Places in Henry County, Kentucky
Houses in Henry County, Kentucky
Houses completed in 1850
1850 establishments in Kentucky
Houses on the National Register of Historic Places in Kentucky
Greek Revival architecture in Kentucky